Linnea Stensils (born 8 March 1994) is a Swedish canoeist. She competed in the women's K-1 200 metres event at the 2016 Summer Olympics. She qualified to represent Sweden in the 2020 Summer Olympics.

References

External links
 

1994 births
Living people
Swedish female canoeists
Olympic canoeists of Sweden
Canoeists at the 2016 Summer Olympics
Place of birth missing (living people)
ICF Canoe Sprint World Championships medalists in kayak
European Games competitors for Sweden
Canoeists at the 2015 European Games
Canoeists at the 2019 European Games
Canoeists at the 2020 Summer Olympics